The 2011 CAF Confederation Cup group stage matches took place between July and September 2011. The matchdays were: 15–17 July, 29–31 July, 12–14 August, 26–28 August, 9–11 September, and 16–18 September.

The group stage featured the eight winners from the play-off round. They were divided into two groups of four, where they played each other home-and-away in a round-robin format. The top two teams in each group advanced to the semifinals.

Seeding
The draw for the group stage (which followed the draw for the play-off round) took place on 15 May 2011, at the CAF Headquarters in Cairo.

The procedures for the group stage draw were announced on 12 May 2011. The winners of the eight play-off round ties were divided into two pots. The winners of the ties involving the two top-seeded teams in the play-off round draw were in Pot 1, while the other six winners were in Pot 2. Each group contained one team from Pot 1 and three teams from Pot 2.

Notes:
Winners of each tie shown in bold
† Loser of play-off due to disqualification of TP Mazembe

Tiebreakers
The order of tie-breakers used when two or more teams have equal number of points is:
 Number of points obtained in games between the teams concerned;
 Goal difference in games between the teams concerned;
 Goals scored in games between the teams concerned;
 Away goals scored in games between the teams concerned;
 Goal difference in all games;
 Goals scored in all games;
 Drawing of lots.

Groups

Group A

Group B

References

External links
CAF Confederation Cup

Group stage